"Shake" is a song by English recording artist Little Boots, released as the lead single from her second studio album, Nocturnes (2013). Written by Boots and James Ford and produced by Ford, the song was released in the United Kingdom on 11 November 2011.

Background
"Shake" premiered on BBC Radio 1 on 11 November 2011 and follows the release of Boots's mixtape Shake Until Your Heart Breaks, released online in October 2011.

Critical reception
MusicOMH described "Shake" as "a pumping, housey, dancefloor stomper, with VERY. DEFINITIVE. BEATS. It is rather good, even though we're in the group of people who normally feel very stupid saying pumping, housey, dancefloor stomper." Ryan Reed of Billboard wrote that the song "detonates only moments into its six-plus minutes, stuffed to the max with a heavy beat and liquid synth-bass that smacks you straight against the night club subwoofers. Repetitive and far from innovative, 'Shake' occasionally threatens to lapse into generic, A Night at the Roxbury-esque territory, but the longer the track drones on, the more likely the listener will fall slave to its sheer determination."

Track listings
UK digital download
"Shake" – 6:19

UK limited 12" single
A1. "Shake"
A2. "Shake" (Acapella)
B1. "Shake" (Original Dub)
B2. "Shake" (Instrumental)

Charts

Release history

References

2011 singles
679 Artists singles
Little Boots songs
Songs written by Little Boots